David Joel Friedland (December 20, 1937 – April 21, 2022) was an American lawyer and Democratic Party politician from Hudson County, who served in the New Jersey General Assembly from 1966 to 1974 and then was elected to the Senate, serving from 1978 until his conviction on racketeering charges in 1980.

While awaiting sentencing, Friedland disappeared in September 1985 by faking his death in a supposed drowning incident off Grand Bahama. He was one of the U.S. government's most wanted fugitives until his capture in the Maldives in 1987, where he drew attention to himself after creating a successful chain of scuba diving shops.

Early life

Friedland was born in 1937 in Jersey City, New Jersey.  His father was Jacob Friedland, a labor attorney who had served in the General Assembly from 1939 until 1952. He attended Stevens Academy in Hoboken and graduated from Tufts University in 1957. He received a law degree from Rutgers School of Law—Newark in 1960 and was admitted to the bar in 1961. His brother is musician and songwriter Stephen Friedland, also known as Brute Force.

One man, one vote
In the wake of the 1964 decision by the Supreme Court of the United States in Reynolds v. Sims, establishing the one man, one vote principle that state legislative districts must be approximately equal in population, Friedland filed suit in New Jersey Supreme Court on behalf of Christopher Jackman of the Laundry Workers Union and Winfield Chasmar, Jr. of the Paper Box Workers Union, challenging a system under which each county was represented by a single member in the New Jersey Senate. The Court agreed, holding the New Jersey Senate apportionment violated the Federal Constitution. In an attempt to void the decision, the senate enacted a proposal whereby each senator's vote would be weighted based on the population of the county represented,  under which Cape May County's senator would receive one vote while the senator from Essex County would receive 19.1, in direct relation to the ratio of residents between counties. In a decision issued on December 15, 1964, the Supreme Court ruled unanimously that the weighted voting system as adopted was unconstitutional. The court ordered that interim measures be established for the 1965 legislative elections, in which weighted voting could be used as a temporary measure, and that the needed constitutional changes to restructure the New Jersey Legislature to be in compliance with "one man, one vote" requirements be in place before elections taking place in 1967.

General Assembly
Friedland was first elected to the New Jersey General Assembly in 1966, serving there until 1974. In a judicial finding announced in February 1971 after a hearing by the New Jersey Supreme Court, Friedland was found to have violated judicial ethics for his efforts in attempting to get charges dropped against an alleged Mafia loan shark. Friedland faced potential disbarment by the court and could have faced censure or expulsion by the New Jersey Legislature. On July 27, 1971, the New Jersey Supreme Court suspended Friedland from the practice of law for a period of six months. Friedland asserted that he had done nothing wrong and would run for re-election. He insisted that as "[t]here had been no charge of impropriety in connection with [his] legislative duties", he expected the General Assembly would take no action against him.

Relating to that same case, Friedland was one of three legislators targeted by Assistant New Jersey Attorney General William J. Brennan the 3rd on December 30, 1968, in which Brennan accused Friedland and two other legislators of being "entirely too comfortable with members of organized crime". Brennan's testimony was based on New Jersey State Police files which alleged that Friedland had acted as the middleman to suppress criminal complaints against a loan shark. Friedland denied Brennan's allegations and demanded his resignation, stating that he had been attempting to settle a usurious loan and that he had not talked to any of the complaining witnesses.

On January 11, 1972, Friedland was one of four Democrats who voted to give the minority Republicans control of the General Assembly, electing Thomas Kean as Assembly Speaker. He justified his actions based on claims that the Democratic leadership had been ignoring the needs of Hudson County, and was joined by Hudson County legislators Michael F. Esposito and David Wallace, along with Edward J. Higgins from nearby Elizabeth. As part of the deal with the Republicans, Friedland was appointed chair of the bipartisan Assembly Conference Committee. Democratic leaders in the Assembly had pushed for S. Howard Woodson of Trenton, who would have been the Assembly's first African American Speaker, and charges of racism were leveled by fellow Democrats against Friedland. Democratic Assemblyman Kenneth A. Gewertz of Gloucester County shouted that "Jesus Christ had his Judas, the Democrats now have their David Friedland". Friedland had wanted the Democrats to name him as Speaker, but they declined based on his involvement in the loan sharking case and that recent political scandals in Hudson County would reflect poorly on Democrats statewide. Instead, they had named S. Howard Woodson as their candidate for speaker. The four defections denied Woodson a chance to become the first African American Speaker in the history of the General Assembly, leading to charges that the dissidents were racially motivated.

State Senate
Friedland, a resident of Jersey City, won an easy race in November 1977 over his Republican opponent to win a seat in the New Jersey Senate. Though Democrats lost seats, they retained control of the Senate.

Friedland was one of 26 Senators to vote in favor of a 1978 bill that restored the death penalty for first degree murder, stating that the people wanted the death penalty restored and that "the fallacy of elitism is that it believes its judgments are superior to those of the common herd".

He served in the Senate from 1978 until his April 1980 conviction, after which he resigned to focus on his appeal. He was succeeded by fellow Democrat James A. Galdieri who took office in a November 1980 special election.

Conviction and disappearance
Friedland was indicted in October 1979 together with his father Jacob for their role in accepting $360,000 in bribes to arrange a $4 million loan from the pension fund of Teamsters Local 701 based in North Brunswick to companies controlled by Barry S. Marlin, an attorney who had been convicted of swindling $43 million in various schemes. After his indictment, Friedland expressed confidence that he would be exonerated.

On April 11, 1980, Friedland and his father were convicted by a jury for taking kickbacks in arranging loans from the Teamsters pension fund, income tax evasion and obstruction of justice  for asking a witness to lie to a grand jury. Still proclaiming his innocence and insisting that he was not obligated to resign as the acts for which he was convicted took place prior to his election, Friedland stated that he would resign immediately from his Senate seat to devote his time to an appeal of the verdict. In 1982, he reached an agreement with the United States Attorney's office in Newark, New Jersey under which he would avoid prison in exchange for his assistance in recording incriminating conversations with his former associates. The Government was later to argue that Friedland  deceived them, faked his death in order not to cooperate, and did not in fact cooperate.

While in the United States Federal Witness Protection Program he took a job with a mortgage firm owned by Joseph J. Higgins, a former member of the New Jersey General Assembly, and they made additional efforts to defraud the same pension fund. The fund suffered no loss.

In 1983, United States Attorney for New Jersey W. Hunt Dumont was reported by The New York Times to be pursuing a major investigation of as many as 50 individuals based on evidence that Friedland had provided. Despite his conviction, Friedland was in Federal custody and told a reporter who had spotted him at Miami International Airport that he could end up spending more than a year in assisting with Federal prosecutions.

Disappearance
While Friedland was awaiting sentencing on September 2, 1985, the United States Coast Guard received a call from a boat off of Grand Bahama reporting that Friedland had disappeared while scuba diving. Friedland was said to have taken pain killers before diving with a friend at a spot 12 miles off of Grand Bahama and had failed to surface. His body was not discovered in an air-sea search and a warrant was issued for his arrest.

He went on the run, using a fake United States passport and traveling under the alias of Richard Smith Harley. During his time on the lam, he had been traced to Kenya, Paris, Venice, Hong Kong and Singapore and worked his way up to become the number one fugitive wanted by the United States Marshals Service. In December 1987, two years after his disappearance, he was arrested by officials in Malé, capital of Maldives, an island country in the Indian Ocean, where he had been working as a scuba dive master. While in the Maldives, Friedland did little to avoid attention, including posing for a post card in which he was in scuba gear feeding a live shark with food held in his own mouth.

Capture and conviction
Friedland was flown back to the United States, arriving at John F. Kennedy International Airport on December 28, 1987, under the custody of the U.S. Marshals Service and taken for arraignment in Federal District court in Brooklyn. Upon his return he vowed to fight the charges against him, but said that "it's good to be back in the United States". Arthur Borinsky, the United States Marshal for New Jersey, quoted Friedland as stating that "he really got tired of running".

In December 1987, United States Judge Dickinson Richards Debevoise ordered Friedland to serve a sentence of seven years in Federal prison, rejecting pleas for leniency from Friedland and claims that the U.S. Attorney's office had violated the terms of a 1982 agreement under which he became an informant in corruption investigations.

In a January 1988 hearing prior to Friedland's trial for conspiracy to defraud the union pension fund, then-First United States Attorney Michael Chertoff told judge John F. Gerry that, while he was in the Maldives, Friedland had contacted Libyan leader Muammar al-Gaddafi as part of an effort to arrange "asylum in Libya or any anti-American country". In September 1988, four days after testimony began in his racketeering trial, Friedland entered a guilty plea to a count of conspiracy under the Racketeer Influenced and Corrupt Organizations Act (RICO) as part of deal with authorities under which mail fraud and wire fraud charges would be dropped. On December 2, 1988, he was sentenced on the RICO count to a 15-year sentence to be served concurrently with the 7-year term applied for his original conviction. A probation officer estimated and the court indicated at that time that Friedland's parole guideline range was between 40 and 52 months.

After Friedland's attorney passed on an offer under which his client would pass on details of illegal drug activity based on information he obtained from other inmates, then-United States Attorney Samuel Alito responded on April 3, 1989, that his office would accept any information offered but would not make any promise to assist Friedland based on the use of any information Friedland might provide. Bypassing Alito's successor Michael Chertoff, Friedland made a deal with Drug Enforcement Administration special agent Anthony Longarzo, under which Friedland provided information that led to several arrests and the seizure of drugs in 1990. The information related to recovery of Stinger missiles from Afghanistan as the drugs were used to purchase weapons for terrorists. In exchange, Longarzo was supposed to recommend to the court and the United States Parole Commission that Friedland's incarceration be shortened.

Friedland was released after eight years at the Federal Correctional Complex, Coleman in Coleman, Florida, and was to spend several months in a halfway house run by the Salvation Army in West Palm Beach, Florida. He was released from the halfway house in July 1997, after serving a total of nine years of his 15-year sentence. He found work with an advertising firm. He died on April 21, 2022.

References

External links

|-

|-

|-

1937 births
2022 deaths
American people convicted of tax crimes
American politicians convicted of bribery
People convicted of obstruction of justice
Politicians convicted of racketeering
Tufts University alumni
Rutgers School of Law–Newark alumni
New Jersey lawyers
Democratic Party New Jersey state senators
Democratic Party members of the New Jersey General Assembly
People who faked their own death
Politicians from Jersey City, New Jersey
New Jersey politicians convicted of crimes